Bad Dreams is a 1988 American supernatural mystery slasher film co-written and directed by Andrew Fleming and starring Jennifer Rubin, Bruce Abbott, E. G. Daily, Dean Cameron, Harris Yulin and Richard Lynch. It was produced by Gale Anne Hurd. The plot follows a woman who awakens from a thirteen-year-long coma and finds herself being stalked by the ghost of a cult leader who led a mass suicide by fire that she survived as a child.

Bad Dreams was released on April 8, 1988, and grossed $9.8 million at the box office on a budget of $4.5 million. However, it was criticized by horror fans and critics alike because of its similarities to A Nightmare on Elm Street (1984), even taking into account that Jennifer Rubin was a supporting actress in A Nightmare on Elm Street 3: Dream Warriors (1987).

Plot
In 1975, a cult called Unity Fields commits mass suicide by fire at the behest of its psychopathic leader, Franklin Harris. Only one young woman named Cynthia Weston, a child at the time of the fire, refuses to commit suicide and barely survives the burning of the house where Unity Fields' cultists lived. Nevertheless, she lies in a coma for thirteen years. After awakening in a hospital, Cynthia is plagued by horrific flashbacks of her childhood at Unity Fields, and is forced to attend experimental group therapy sessions for borderline personality disorder at the facility, led by Dr. Alex Karmen. Karmen is not sure that Cynthia belongs inside the group's dynamic, but his peer and mentor, Dr. Berrisford, convinces him to help Cynthia to gradually accustom to urban life in a world that has changed a lot in thirteen years. Eventually, Alex sympathizes with Cynthia's story and tries to help her overcome her fears and feelings of estrangement.

Cynthia is disturbed by a vision she has of Harris drowning Lana, another patient, in a baptismal ceremony; moments later, Lana is found drowned in a swimming pool. Cynthia's visions become more vivid, and Harris begins to appear to her with his flesh burnt. When her roommate, Miriam, is discharged from the hospital, Cynthia has a vision of Harris in the elevator with her; however, the doors close before she is able to warn her. Miriam is found dead on the sidewalk in front of the hospital, having leapt from a window in what appears to be a suicide. Alex reassures Cynthia that she is not to blame for the deaths, but she is frequently visited by visions of Harris, who claims to have killed her friends and pressures Cynthia to commit suicide, saying that the only way to stop anyone from dying is to take her own life and join him and the other Unity Fields' victims in the afterlife.

A male and female patient who are lovers are later killed by the blades of an industrial fan in the utility room of the hospital, which Cynthia also attributes to Harris. She believes Harris has come back from the dead to kill those around her. Ralph Pesco, a troubled masochist patient with a tendency for violent outbursts, becomes enamored with Cynthia; finding himself on the edge after the deaths of his fellow members in the group, he knocks down a policeman who was watching him, and goes to talk to Cynthia, who was spending the night with Dr. Karmen in order to feel safe. When he is distracted, Ralph and Cynthia take an elevator to the basement of the hospital. There, during an apparent episode of psychosis and violence, he commits suicide by stabbing himself multiple times in the abdomen.

Awakening from sedation after the incident, Cynthia finds Harris sitting in her room, calling her his "love child," and urging her to commit suicide. Shortly after, Harris apparently visits Gilda (a clairvoyant patient who asked Cynthia to fight the person who is haunting her, and to stay alive) in her room. Instead of allowing him to kill her, she drinks formaldehyde she stole from a supply room, effectively killing herself. Meanwhile, Dr. Karmen discovers his corrupt peer, Dr. Berrisford, has intentionally laced the therapy group's drugs with psychogenic substances, in the hope that it will effectively make the patients suicidal, and thus corroborate Berrisford's research. Alex realizes that Cynthia's suicide is the ultimate goal for Berrisford, so he orders the nurses to call the police and Detective Wasserman, who was investigating what happened at Unity Fields before the suicides began. Alex confronts Cynthia, insisting her visions of Harris are not real. He is surprised by Berrisford from behind, who knocks him out and takes Cynthia with him.

Dr. Karmen wakes up and pulls the hospital's emergency alarm, which elicits chaos. Cynthia goes to the rooftop, where Alex finds her standing on the ledge, with Berrisford at her side, encouraging her to jump. She leaps from the building, but before hitting the ground below, awakens back at the house in which the Unity Fields members committed suicide. There, she is confronted by Harris, who welcomes her; however, it is only a vision, and she awakens to Alex holding her by the arm as they both dangle over the ledge. Berrisford, knowing that Dr. Karmen has discovered his plot, stabs Alex's hand and attempts to push him to his death as well. His attempt is thwarted by the arrival of the police and Wasserman, who help Alex and Cynthia to climb back. Berrisford uses the distraction to grab one of the cops revolver, and readily insists that Dr. Karmen is responsible for altering the patients' medication and the suicides. Alex explains to the police that things are the other way around and shows how Berrisford stabbed his hand. Knowing that all of his schemes have failed, Berrisford pulls the stolen revolver and pretends to commit suicide, but quickly points the gun towards Alex. Before he shoots, Cynthia finally confronts her fear of Harris, realizing that Berrisford is a totally different person, and reacts by charging and pushing him over the ledge to his death.

The authorities retreat from the rooftop. While being comforted there by Dr. Karmen, Cynthia has another brief vision of Harris climbing back from the edge of the building and trying to grab her, which scares her for a second. Alex shakes Cynthia and reassures her that her nightmares are over and there is nothing to fear anymore. She calms down and they both tightly embrace one another.

Cast

Production
Bad Dreams was shot on location in Los Angeles, California over a period of eight weeks, with production beginning on October 26, 1987, and concluding in mid-December. Shooting locations included the California Medical Center and California Medical Building in Los Angeles; Lakeview Hospital in Lake View Terrace; and the Brentwood Veterans Hospital. The budget for the production was $4.5 million.

According to "Bad Dreams" writer/director Andrew Fleming on the DVD commentary, the choice of the end title song was the greatest drama in the whole making of this film.

Fleming wanted to use a live version of the song “Burning House of Love” by "X," while 20th Century Fox executive Ralph Sall suggested “Sweet Child o' Mine” by then-unknown band "Guns ‘N Roses", thinking it would be cheaper and a possible hit.

Fleming liked Sall’s suggestion but didn’t think it was as appropriate. Eventually Sall got his way.

“I think we licensed it for about five cents,” Fleming said. “And only weeks after did it actually become a hit.”

According to Fleming, "Guns ‘N Roses" were also going to do a video that incorporated clips from the movie.

“They came in and watched it and were stoked by the movie,” Fleming said. “But then Axl Rose's girlfriend, Erin Everly, said the song was about her. She didn’t want a song about her to have clips from a horror movie in it. So she got her way. We didn’t get a video, but Ralph was right about the song.”

Release

Box office
The film was released theatrically in the United States by 20th Century Fox on April 8, 1988. It grossed $9,797,098 at the U.S. box office.

Critical response
Bad Dreams received mixed-to-negative reviews from critics. It holds a rating of 38% on Rotten Tomatoes based on 16 reviews.

Roger Ebert of the Chicago Sun-Times gave the film a half-star out of four, writing: "I praise the production only to suggest that these people should be better employed in worthier projects. It is not surprising to see a violent teenage film exploiting the lowest common denominator and preaching a message of nihilism and despair. It is not surprising to see the latest special-effect technology supplying lingering closeups of burnt flesh and other horrors. What is surprising, I suppose, is that nice people would want to wade in this sewer."

Vincent Canby of The New York Times gave the film a middling review, calling it a "a breezy, bloody kind of amalgam of The Breakfast Club and A Nightmare on Elm Street... It doesn't make a tremendous amount of sense, plot-wise, and it's instantly forgettable. However, it's amusing for as long as it lasts. Also, for a film of this genre, it has a cast of unusually good actors."

Home media
The film was released on DVD in the United States by Anchor Bay Entertainment in 2006. This version is out of print.

The film was later released by Scream Factory along with Visiting Hours, first as a double feature DVD on September 13, 2011 and then a similar Blu-ray release followed on February 18, 2014.

A UK Blu-Ray was issued by 88 Films in July 2018.

See also
 A Nightmare on Elm Street series

References

External links
 
 
 

1988 horror films
1988 films
1980s slasher films
20th Century Fox films
American supernatural horror films
1980s English-language films
American slasher films
Films about cults
Films about psychiatry
Films about suicide
Films directed by Andrew Fleming
Films produced by Gale Anne Hurd
Films set in hospitals
Films set in psychiatric hospitals
Films shot in Los Angeles
Psychotherapy in fiction
1988 directorial debut films
Films with screenplays by Steven E. de Souza
1980s American films